Shirley Wind is a wind farm in the Shirley section of Glenmore, Brown County, Wisconsin. Originally developed by Emerging Energies LLC, it is owned by Duke Energy.

When the wind farm was built, the turbines were the tallest in the state of Wisconsin, and among the tallest in North America.

Following a study conducted in 2013, the Brown County Board of Health declared the Shirley Wind Farm a “human health hazard” in 2014. In 2015 the Brown County Health Director Chua Xiong said that there was insufficient scientific evidence to link wind turbines to illnesses experienced by residents.

History
Shirley Wind was originally developed by Emerging Energies LLC, a Wisconsin wind energy company. Emerging Energies had been looking to construct a wind farm in northeast Wisconsin since 2004. The permits were secured from the town of Glenmore in 2007.

In 2009, Emerging Energies sold a 90 percent stake in the project to Central Hudson Energy Group.

Construction on the wind farm began in April 2009. The farm began commercial operation in December 2010, selling the power to Wisconsin Public Service Corporation.

In 2011, Duke Energy purchased Shirley Wind.

Electricity Production 

* Data not available

Health hazard
Soon after the wind farm went into operation, local residents began complaining of health problems they said were caused by low frequency noise stemming from the wind turbines. Ultimately, over 75 local residents filed complaints with the Brown County Board of Health.

In January 2012, the Brown County Board of Health requested emergency aid from the state to assist families suffering from the effects of the wind farm.

In January 2013, a study of the low frequency noise was completed, which showed that three of the houses studied had evidence of low frequency noise, but in only one house was that noise coming from the outside. However, the study could not conclude that the health effects experienced by local residents were caused by the wind farm.

In October 2014, the Brown County Board of Health declared the Shirley Wind farm a "human health hazard", based on the complaints of local residents, becoming the first board of health in the country to make such a declaration.

In December 2015, after reviewing studies and evidence, Brown County Health Director Chua Xiong declared that there was insufficient evidence linking the wind turbines to the illnesses suffered by local residents.

This decision was called into question after an Open Records request revealed that Xiong experienced migraines when near the wind turbines.  She said: "The times I have been out there by the Wind Turbines, l get such migraine headaches, I think I should take some preventative Tylenol before I head out there."

Migraines are a frequently observed symptom reported to the Brown County Health Department by people living near Shirley Wind's turbines when they are operating.

Xiong resigned her position the day before the emails were revealed to a local citizen's group through an Open Records request.

See also

Wind power in Wisconsin
Solar power in Wisconsin
Wind power in the United States
List of wind farms

References 

Buildings and structures in Brown County, Wisconsin
Wind farms in Wisconsin
Duke Energy